The 1956 Paris–Nice was the 14th edition of the Paris–Nice cycle race and was held from 13 March to 17 March 1956. The race started in Créteil and finished in Nice. The race was won by Fred De Bruyne.

General classification

References

1956
1956 in road cycling
1956 in French sport
March 1956 sports events in Europe